Barney Sablotney House is a historic home located at Gary, Indiana.  It was built in 1928, and is a -story, five bay by two bay, Colonial Revival style frame dwelling sheathed in yellow glazed brick.  The main block is flanked by one-story wings.

It was listed in the National Register of Historic Places in 2012.

References

Houses on the National Register of Historic Places in Indiana
Colonial Revival architecture in Indiana
Houses completed in 1928
National Register of Historic Places in Gary, Indiana
Houses in Lake County, Indiana